MT, Mt, mT, mt, or Mt. may refer to:

Arts and entertainment

Gaming
 MT Framework, a proprietary game engine
 Empty, meaning "out of ammunition", in slang
 Main Tank, the person who soaks up all the damage in an MMORPG; see Tank (gaming)
 Moon Tycoon, a simulation computer game
 Monopoly Tycoon, a video game
 Muscle Tracer, an enemy in the Armored Core video game series
 Wangan Midnight Maximum Tune, an arcade racing game

Literature and journalism
 M. T. Vasudevan Nair, a Malayalam writer
 Meridian Tonight, a British regional news programme
 Motor Trend, an automotive magazine
 The Moscow Times
 The Musical Times, a classical music journal
 Tramways & Urban Transit formerly Modern Tramway, a British magazine

Music
 Marianas Trench (band), a Canadian pop rock band
 Master tone, a form of musical ringtone
 Modern Talking, a band
 The Musical Times, a classical music journal

Other media
 Magical Trevor, a cartoon by Jonti Picking
 Megatokyo, a webcomic
 MT (Infinity Train), a fictional character in the television series Infinity Train
 Megatron (Transformers), a fictional robot/character in the Transformers franchise
 Musical theatre

Businesses and organizations
 MT-Propeller, a German aircraft propeller manufacturer
 Mauritius Telecom, a telecommunications and Internet service provider
 Media Temple, a website hosting company
 Mississauga Transit, a public transit operator in Mississauga, Ontario
 Monotype Corporation, a font company
 Movable Type, a weblog publishing system
 Thomas Cook Airlines (IATA airline designator code MT)

Military
 Motor transport
Military time

Places
 Mt or Mt., an abbreviation for the word mount, meaning mountain
 Malta (ISO 3166-1 alpha-2 code MT), a nation of Mediterranean islands
 .mt, the top-level Internet domain for Malta
 Maltese language (ISO 639 alpha-2 language code mt)
 Martin, Slovakia (vehicle plate code MT)
 Matera, Italy (vehicle plate code MT)
 Mato Grosso (ISO 3166-2:BR subdivision code MT), a state in Brazil
 Montana (postal code MT), US
 Mountain Time Zone, a time zone in North America

Religion
 Gospel of Matthew, a part of the New Testament
 Masoretic Text, the Hebrew text of the Jewish Bible (Tanakh)

Science, technology, and mathematics

Biology and medicine

Biology
 Medial temporal, part of the temporal lobe of the brain
 Metallothionein, a protein
 Methyltransferase, a type of enzyme
 Microtubule, a component of the cytoskeleton
 Middle temporal area, a region of the visual cortex (also called V5) where the motion of objects is analyzed
 Mitochondrion, an organelle found in most eukaryotic cells

Medicine
 Magnetization transfer, a process contributing to image contrast in Magnetic resonance imaging
 Massage therapy, adding directed pressure to the body
 Massage therapist, the title of someone who performs massage therapy
 Music therapy, the clinical use of music to improve health and quality of life
 Medical technologist, a healthcare professional who performs diagnostic tests
 Medical transcriptionist, an allied-health professional who transcribes dictated medical reports
 Motivational therapy, a treatment for substance abuse
Methyltestosterone

Computing and telecommunications
 .mt, the top-level Internet domain for Malta
 MT Framework, a proprietary game engine
 Machine translation, a subfield of computational linguistics
 Magnetic tape data storage, a digital recording method using magnetic tape
 Megatransfer, in computing, equal to one million transfer operations per second
 Mersenne twister, a pseudorandom number generator algorithm
 Mistype, a declaration of a mistake or typo when typing in a live-text platform such as instant messenger
 Mobile-terminated, a call, text message or data received on a mobile telephone
 Mobile Terminal, part of a Mobile Station in the GSM system architecture
 Multithreading (computer architecture), in computer hardware
 Multithreading (software), in computer software
 Multi-topology routing (also abbreviated MTR), an extension to the OSPF internet routing protocol

Mathematics and logic
 Modus tollens, a concept in logic

Transportation
 Honda MT, a motorcycle
 Yamaha MT series, a family of motorcycles 
 Hyundai Mega Truck, a medium-duty truck
 Manual transmission, a part of a car
 MT or Marquitrans, a Spanish microcar

Units of measurement
 Megatesla (MT), the SI unit of magnetic flux density
 Megaton (Mt), a TNT equivalent unit of explosive power
 Megatonne (Mt), a unit of mass equal to one billion kilograms (109 kg)
 Megatransfer, in computing, equal to one million transfer operations per second
 Metric ton (t), equal to one thousand kilograms
 Millitesla (mT), the SI unit of magnetic flux density

Other uses in science and technology
 Machine taper, a system for securing accessories to a machine tool (or Morse taper, one particular type of machine taper)
 Magnetotellurics, a method of imaging underground structures
 Materials Today, a scientific journal
 Maxim–Tokarev, a Russian light machine gun
 Meitnerium, symbol Mt, a chemical element

Other uses
 MT (footballer) (born 2001), Matheus Nunes Fagundes de Araújo, Brazilian footballer
 Maltese language (ISO 639 alpha-2 language code "mt")
 Management team
 Master of Arts in Teaching, a graduate degree in teaching; some schools use MT (Master of Teaching) rather than MAT
 "Membership Training", in Korea, trips taken for the purpose of team building
 Motor Tanker or Motor Transport, in the name of a ship
Name prefix for Merchant vessels Motor Tanker or Motor Tug Boat
 Muay Thai, a Thai martial art

See also
 The Maria Theresa thaler, generally abbreviated  but sometimes also seen as 
 Mountain
 TM (disambiguation)